Beatriz Haddad Maia (born 30 May 1996) is a Brazilian professional tennis player. On 13 February 2023, she reached a career-high in the WTA rankings in singles at No. 12. Haddad Maia has won two singles and four doubles titles on the WTA Tour, one singles and doubles title each on the WTA Challenger Tour, as well as 17 singles and nine doubles titles on the ITF Circuit.

Playing for Brazil Fed Cup team, Haddad Maia has a win–loss record of 25–10 as of December 2022.

Early life and background
Born in São Paulo, to her parents Ayrton Elias Maia Filho and Lais Scaff Haddad, Haddad Maia started playing tennis at the age of five. She comes from a tennis family of Lebanese descent.  Both her mother Lais Scaff Haddad and her grandmother Arlette Scaff Haddad were successful tennis players in Brazil.

Career
Haddad Maia peaked at No. 15 in the ITF junior rankings. She won her first professional doubles title at the $10k tournament in Mogi das Cruzes in September 2010 aged 14 playing, alongside Flávia Guimarães Bueno and her first professional singles title at the $10k tournament in Goiânia in 2011 aged 15.

Her best achievement as a junior player was being doubles runner-up at the French Open twice in 2012 and 2013 partnering with Paraguayan Montserrat González and Ecuadorian Doménica González respectively. She was also a doubles semifinalist at the Wimbledon Championships in 2011 playing alongside Mayya Katsitadze from Russia.

She turned professional in 2014, and in December 2014, she was Brazil's second highest ranked female tennis player.

She made her WTA Tour-level debut at the 2013 Brasil Tennis Cup in Florianópolis as a wildcard. She scored her first WTA Tour main-draw win against Hsu Chieh-yu in the first round before losing to Melinda Czink in the second round. At the same tournament, Haddad Maia made her WTA Tour-level doubles main-draw debut with partner Carla Forte. They defeated Mailen Auroux and María Irigoyen in the first round before losing in the quarterfinals to Kristina Barrois and Tatjana Maria.

In 2014, she was handed a wildcard at both the Rio Open and Brasil Tennis Cup main draws, losing in the first round of singles and doubles of both tournaments.

In February 2015, aged 18 and ranked 234th, she reached the quarterfinals of the Rio Open as a wildcard, defeating two higher ranked opponents, María Irigoyen and top 100 Polona Hercog. In the quarterfinals against 16th ranked and first seed Sara Errani, she had three match points, but eventually retired in the third set due to injury. Playing alongside Teliana Pereira, she reached the semifinals in the doubles competition but was forced to withdraw due to the injury sustained in the singles competition. Haddad Maia played qualifying tournaments at Charleston and Bogotá during the clay season, reaching the main draw of Bogotá where she ultimately lost in the second round.

At Bogotá, Haddad Maia won her first WTA Tour doubles title, alongside compatriot Paula Cristina Gonçalves, defeating Irina Falconi and Shelby Rogers in the final. She played the qualifying tournament at the 2015 French Open but was knocked out by Olivia Rogowska after winning her first two matches. During the grass-court season, she played the qualifying tournaments of Nottingham and Wimbledon, but failed to reach the main draw of both.

In July 2015, she suffered a shoulder injury at the Pan American Games in Toronto, resulting in season-ending surgery.

In 2016, Haddad Maia was awarded wildcards at the Rio Open (where she also played doubles, losing in the first round), Miami Open, making her debut at a Premier tournament, and Brasil Tennis Cup losing in the first round in all three tournaments. She also played qualifying tournaments at the French Open and US Open losing in the second and first round of qualifying, respectively.

Having fallen to the 367th position in the rankings by July 18, 2016, Haddad Maia recovered almost 200 spots during the second half of 2016, finishing the year with two consecutive $50k titles in Scottsdale and Waco, finishing the year ranked 170th in the world.

2017: Top 100, first singles final

Haddad Maia started her 2017 season in Australia, playing two tournaments in Perth before winning the $25k event in Clare, South Australia in both singles and doubles with partner Genevieve Lorbergs. She received a wildcard for the Miami Open, defeating Lesia Tsurenko in the first round, before losing to Venus Williams in her second match. She played the qualifying at Monterrey, but lost to Kristie Ahn, after winning her first two matches.

At Bogotá, she once again played the qualifying tournament and won an entry to the main draw. She lost in the first round to Verónica Cepede Royg. In the doubles tournament, she won her second title at the event. Playing alongside Argentinian Nadia Podoroska, she defeated Cepede Royg and Magda Linette in the final.

During the European clay season, she entered the qualifying tournament at Stuttgart, but lost in her opening match. At the Prague Open, she defeated two top 100 players, Ekaterina Alexandrova and Donna Vekić, in the qualifying to enter the main draw, in which she subsequently defeated Christina McHale (ranked 45th) and Samantha Stosur (19th), recording her first career wins over top 50 and top 20 players, respectively, before falling to Kristýna Plíšková in the quarterfinals. She left Prague ranked 115th in the world. Her win over Stosur was the first win for a Brazilian over a top-20 player since Niege Dias defeated Arantxa Sánchez Vicario in the 1987 US Open.

The following week, Haddad Maia had the best performance of her career at the $100k Open de Cagnes-sur-Mer, where she won the title without dropping a set, defeating Jil Teichmann in the final. As a result, Haddad Maia made her debut in the top 100 of the WTA rankings.

As the third seed at the French Open's qualifying tournament, Haddad Maia won all three of her qualifying matches, earning a spot in the main draw of a Grand Slam tournament for the first time in her career. In the first round, she faced the 14th seed Elena Vesnina and was defeated in three sets. Also on clay, she reached the semifinals of the Bol Open, a WTA 125 event, before losing to eventual champion Aleksandra Krunić. As a result, she climbed to the 94th place in the rankings on June 12.

During the grass-court season, she played the qualifying of Mallorca and reached the main draw, losing to Shelby Rogers in the first round. In Eastbourne, she lost in the first round of qualifying to Mona Barthel. Haddad Maia received her first direct acceptance at a Grand Slam main draw at Wimbledon, where she beat Laura Robson in the first round. Her victory marked the first time a Brazilian woman won a Wimbledon main-draw match since Gisele Miró in 1989. Haddad Maia lost in the second round to second seed Simona Halep. In the doubles competition, after defeating the sixth seeds Abigail Spears and Katarina Srebotnik in the first round, she reached the third round with Croatian partner Ana Konjuh, where the team lost to ninth seeds Chan Hao-ching and Monica Niculescu.

During the hard court season, she entered the Premier 5 Cincinnati qualifying tournament, where she reached the main draw and defeated Lauren Davis in the first round before eventually losing to fourth seed and eventual champion Garbiñe Muguruza in the second round. She entered the New Haven qualifying, but lost in the first qualifying round to Christina McHale. At the US Open, Haddad Maia lost in the first round to Donna Vekić. Playing once again alongside Ana Konjuh, she lost in the first round of the doubles competition to 13th seeds Kristina Mladenovic and Anastasia Pavlyuchenkova.

She gained her first direct acceptance at a WTA Tour-level tournament at the Korean Open. Haddad Maia reached her maiden tour-level singles final at the tournament, losing to first seed and French Open champion Jeļena Ostapenko. In the process, Haddad Maia became the first Brazilian to reach a non-clay-court final since Cláudia Monteiro in the 1983 Pittsburgh Open and secured her debut in the top 60 of the world rankings.

Haddad Maia was seeded second in the qualifying round of the last Premier Mandatory of the year, in Beijing, but she lost in her opening match against Andrea Petkovic. At the Tianjin Open she defeated fourth seed Donna Vekić in the first round, but ultimately lost to qualifier Sara Errani in the following match.

Haddad Maia finished her 2017 season at the Luxembourg Open, where she was seeded at a WTA-level tournament for the first time in her career. She lost in the second round of singles competition to Johanna Larsson, and in the quarterfinals of the doubles tournament playing alongside Cepede Royg to Varvara Lepchenko and Fanny Stollár.

2018: Injury and hiatus
Haddad Maia started her 2018 season playing two WTA International tournaments. In Auckland, she was defeated in the first round by fourth seed Agnieszka Radwańska and in Hobart, she scored her first win of the season against wildcard Lizette Cabrera, but ultimately lost to second seed and eventual champion, Elise Mertens, in the second round. At the Australian Open, she once again defeated Cabrera in the first round, but was eliminated in the following match by sixth seed Karolína Plíšková. Haddad Maia's victory in the first round marked the first time a Brazilian woman won an Australian Open main-draw match in the Open Era and the first time since Maria Esther Bueno reached the final in 1965. At the doubles tournament, Haddad Maia played alongside Sorana Cîrstea and reached the third round, defeating 15th seeds Alicja Rosolska and Abigail Spears en route, before being eliminated by fourth seeds Lucie Šafářová and Barbora Strýcová.

After the Australian Open, she played for Brazil at the American Fed Cup Zone six rubbers between both singles and doubles and won five of them. At the Mexican Open in Acapulco, she defeated Heather Watson in the first round but ultimately lost to second seed Kristina Mladenovic in the following match. She played alongside Cepede Royg in the doubles competition, but lost to fourth seeds Lara Arruabarrena and Arantxa Parra Santonja in the opening round.

Haddad Maia was eliminated by Monica Puig in the opening round of the Indian Wells Open, the first Premier Mandatory of the year. In Miami, she defeated Heather Watson and 31st seed Zhang Shuai to score her first back-to-back tour matches wins since her campaign to the 2017 Korea Open final before losing to sixth seed Jeļena Ostapenko in the third round.

She started her clay-court season in Charleston, but was forced to retire in her first-round match against Lara Arruabarrena due to a left wrist injury. She then withdrew from Bogotá and Istanbul due to that injury. At the Prague Open, she was eliminated in the first round by the seventh seed and eventual runner-up, Mihaela Buzărnescu. She entered the qualifying tournament in Madrid as the fifth seed, but was defeated by Sara Errani. Haddad Maia was forced to withdraw from the remaining of the clay-court season and the grass-court season due to a lower back injury and a subsequent surgery.

2019–20: Doping suspension and return

Haddad Maia qualified for the Australian Open, reaching the second round of the main draw. She also reached the quarterfinals, as a qualifier, at the WTA Tour event in Acapulco in late February, before losing to eventual champion Wang Yafan.

Again out of the qualifying, Haddad Maia reached the semifinals at the Copa Colsanitas, losing to eventual champion Amanda Anisimova.

After retiring due to injury in the first round of qualifying at the French Open, she played a WTA Challenger event in Bol, Croatia during the second week of the French Open. It was there, following a first-round loss to Sara Sorribes Tormo that she reportedly failed the urine test.
On 23 July 2019, it was announced by the International Tennis Federation (ITF) that Haddad Maia had been issued an immediate provisional suspension, pending determination of the charge against her at a full hearing, after a positive test for metabolites of two Selective androgen receptor modulator substances.
The ITF's announcement stated that Haddad Maia waived the right to an immediate appeal. A full hearing to determine the charge against her was scheduled to be held at a later date.

In February 2020, the ITF issued the verdict that the supplement ingested was contaminated. It defined the suspension for ten months, considering the time she was away. The federation's report didn't release her from responsibilities, citing the case of fellow Brazilian tennis players Marcelo Demoliner, Thomaz Bellucci and Igor Marcondes, who had found themselves in a similar situation. The ITF removed the bigger sentence, which could have gone from two to four years. Haddad Maia was free to return on May 22, the eve of the Roland Garros tournament. However, without ranking, having dropped to 1342nd during the suspension, she could not compete in French Grand Slam event, having to start in small tournaments again.

After widespread cancellation of tournaments due to the COVID-19 pandemic, she returned to play in September 2020 at the ITF tournament of Montemor-o-Novo in Portugal. Haddad won the title and three more on Portuguese soil in the next month, until a hand injury led to an enchondroma diagnosis, forcing her to go through a season-ending surgery.

2021: Indian Wells fourth round, back to top 100
In October, at the rescheduled Indian Wells Open, Haddad Maia lost in qualifying to Usue Maitane Arconada but was awarded a spot in the main draw as a lucky loser following the withdrawal of 29th seed Nadia Podoroska. She defeated Mayar Sherif in the second round, and then upset top seed and world No. 3, Karolína Plíšková, to advance to the fourth round. While Haddad then lost to Anett Kontaveit, the performance was enough to return to the top 100.

2022: Major doubles & WTA 1000 singles finals, top 15 in singles & doubles, WTA Finals
Haddad Maia would have played at Melbourne with Podoroska, until the Argentinian withdrew with an abdomen injury. Having to get a partner among the world's top 70, Haddad first contacted former partner Ana Konjuh, who did not respond, and then started checking the WTA doubles ranking, coming down to Anna Danilina, who she met a decade prior in a junior tournament. Danilina accepted the invitation, even if she was playing in Tunisia and thus unsure of when she could get to Australia. Haddad said that if possible, she could arrive a week earlier so they could play the warm-up event Sydney International. The players only got together the same day they would play the first game, yet went all the way to the title, the first time either player won a WTA 500 event. She reached the semifinals for the first time at a Grand Slam championship, and became the first Brazilian woman to go so far in Australia in the Open era, with the previous best result being Maria Esther Bueno's semifinal in 1965. She went one step further into the final with a straight victory by upsetting Japanese No. 2 seeds, Shuko Aoyama and Ena Shibahara, making Haddad only the third Brazilian woman in a Grand Slam final, after Maria Bueno and Cláudia Monteiro. While Haddad and Danilina won the first set against top seeds Barbora Krejčíková and Kateřina Siniaková, the Czechs won in a comeback. Thanks to the accumulated points in the two tournaments, Haddad Maia rose from No. 483 in the WTA doubles rankings all the way to No. 40.

Haddad then decided to play more doubles tournaments with Danilina, even if her singles career would take precedence. After missing the Dubai Open due to testing positive for COVID-19, Haddad resumed playing at the Qatar Ladies Open. Her best performance after the Australian Open was in the Monterrey Open, reaching the semifinals, where she lost to eventual champion Leylah Fernandez. Haddad also managed another upset over a top-5 player at the Miami Open, beating world No. 3 Maria Sakkari to reach the third round on a WTA 1000 level for the third time in her career.

In May, Haddad won her first WTA 125 tournament, the Open de Saint-Malo, defeating Russian Anna Blinkova, and afterwards won the doubles at the Trophee Lagardère in Paris alongside Mladenovic, while also being runner-up in the singles to Claire Liu. As a result, Haddad Maia surpassed her previous career-high of 57 in the WTA singles rankings with No. 49, becoming the first Brazilian in the top 50 since Teliana Pereira in 2015.

After the French Open where she fell in the second round of singles and doubles, and the mixed doubles quarterfinals, Haddad won her biggest singles title at the WTA 250 Nottingham Open, while also winning the doubles tournament alongside Zhang Shuai. The results boosted her to the top 40 in the singles and top 30 in doubles rankings. She followed up this victory by facing Zhang in the final of the Birmingham Classic, where Haddad won her second singles title after the Chinese retired in the first set. The title propelled her into the top 30 in singles for the first time in her career. She joined Ons Jabeur, who won in Berlin less than an hour earlier, and Iga Świątek as players to win multiple WTA Tour titles in the season. She was also the first Brazilian to win in the tournament 40-year history. Gisele Miró had the best previous result by a player from Brazil, reaching the second round in 1989. When Haddad lost her Eastbourne International semifinal match to Petra Kvitová, she had twelve wins and a walkover, the longest winning streak on grass courts since Serena Williams a decade prior. Despite impressive form in the warm-up grass-court tournaments, she lost in the first round of Wimbledon to Kaja Juvan. In doubles, partnering with Magdalena Fręch, the pair lost to tenth seeds Nicole Melichar/Ellen Perez in the third round. She reached the top 25 in doubles and in singles, on July 11 and August 8, respectively.

Ranked No. 24 in singles at the start of the Canadian Open, she defeated Martina Trevisan, 13th seed Leylah Fernandez, and world No. 1, Iga Świątek, her fifth top-5 win to advance to the quarterfinals for the first time in her career at a WTA 1000 level. Next, she reached semifinals defeating the Olympic champion Belinda Bencic. As a result, she reached the top 20 in the singles rankings, on 15 August 2022. Haddad Maia then breezed past former number one, Karolína Plíšková, to become the first Brazilian woman ever to reach a WTA 1000 final. She lost the final against Simona Halep, in three sets. In the Cincinnati Open, Haddad Maia lost in the first round to Jeļena Ostapenko while reaching the third in doubles alongside Danilina. Afterwards, she reached the top 15 in the rankings, on 22 August 2022.

At the US Open, seeded No. 15, she lost in the second round to Bianca Andreescu, in straight sets. Haddad Maia had five break points, but failed to convert any. Partnering Danilina, she lost again in the third round of the doubles tournament to tenth seeded pair Melichar/Perez.

At the WTA 1000 in Guadajalara, Haddad Maia and Danilina reached the final by defeating the world's No. 1 duo Krejčíková/Siniaková in a rematch. With that, she became the first Brazilian woman in history to qualify for the WTA Finals. Thanks to this result, she also entered the world's top 15 in doubles for the first time. In an unprecedented Brazilian final at the WTA 1000 level against Luisa Stefani, a former world top 10, and Storm Sanders, they ended runners-up in a tight result, with a score of 7–6, 6–7 and [10–8] in favor of Stefani/Sanders. Haddad Maia finished the season being awarded by the WTA as Most Improved Player of 2022.

2023: Sixth top-10 win
At the WTA 500 in Abu Dhabi she reached the quarterfinals after more than a 3 hour battle with qualifier Yulia Putintseva in a three set match with two tiebreaks. Next she reached the semifinals, defeating another Kazakhstani player, third seed and top-10 player Elena Rybakina, and recording a six-match winning streak against top-10 players. She lost to Belinda Bencic in straight sets. As a result she moved to a career-high ranking of No. 12 on 13 February 2023.

Performance timelines

Only main-draw results in WTA Tour, Grand Slam tournaments, Fed Cup/Billie Jean King Cup and Olympic Games are included in win–loss records.

Singles
Current after 2023 BNP Paribas Open.

Doubles
Current after the 2023 Indian Wells Masters.

Significant finals

Grand Slam tournament finals

Doubles: 1 (runner-up)

WTA 1000 finals

Singles: 1 (runner-up)

Doubles: 2 (2 runner-ups)

WTA career finals

Singles: 4 (2 titles, 2 runner-ups)

Doubles: 7 (4 titles, 3 runner-ups)

WTA Challenger finals

Singles: 2 (1 title, 1 runner-up)

Doubles: 1 (title)

ITF Circuit finals

Singles: 25 (17 titles, 8 runner–ups)

Doubles: 15 (9 titles, 6 runner–ups)

Junior Grand Slam finals

Girls' doubles: 2 (2 runner–ups)

WTA Tour career earnings
Current through the 2022 Tallinn Open.

Career Grand Slam statistics

Seedings
The tournaments won by Haddad Maia are in boldface, and advanced into finals by Haddad Maia are in italics.

Best Grand Slam results details

Record against other players

No. 1 wins

Record against top 10 players
 She has a  record against players who were, at the time the match was played, ranked in the top 10.

Double bagel matches

Longest winning streak

12 matches (2022)

Notes

References

External links

 
 
 

1996 births
Living people
Tennis players from São Paulo
Brazilian female tennis players
Brazilian people of Lebanese descent
Tennis players at the 2015 Pan American Games
Doping cases in tennis
Pan American Games competitors for Brazil
Sportspeople of Lebanese descent